Jorge Barrios may refer to:
Jorge Barrios (footballer) (born 1961), Uruguayan footballer/manager 
Jorge Rodrigo Barrios (born 1976), Argentine boxer